Syncuaria mycteriae, is a medium-sized parasitic nematode, first described in 2003. Birds of Ciconiiformes serve as the host. It is found in Costa Rica. It is most similar to  S. leptoptili, a sister species, and S.  squamata. However, it has longer left spicule than any other species in Syncuaria.

References 

Parasites
Spirurida
Animals described in 2003